Dynoides serratisinus is a species of isopod in the family Sphaeromatidae. It is found in the Indian Ocean.

References

serratisinus
Crustaceans of the Indian Ocean
Crustaceans described in 1914